Heroine is a 2012 Indian Hindi-language drama film directed, written, and co-produced by Madhur Bhandarkar. Revolving around the life of a once-successful film actress whose career is on the decline, the film features Kareena Kapoor as the protagonist along with actors Arjun Rampal and Randeep Hooda. Additionally, the film also stars Shahana Goswami, Raqesh Bapat, Divya Dutta, Helen, Shilpi Sharma, Mugdha Godse and Lillete Dubey in supporting roles.

Heroine released on 21 September 2012 across 2000 screens, coinciding with Kapoor's 32nd birthday. Despite mixed critical opinions on the film, Kapoor's performance was highly acclaimed and is considered to be one of her best. Kapoor received a Best Actress nomination at the 58th Filmfare Awards for her performance in the film.

Plot
A journalist reports on the life of Mahi Arora, a renowned actress and film heroine, describing her as unstable and problematic, but damaged and lonely due to childhood trauma, and bipolar disorder. Through a flashback, we are shown Mahi's relationship with leading actor, Aryan. Aryan is going through a divorce with his wife whilst dating Mahi. The couple makes a sex tape of themselves. When Mahi learns of an intimate scene Aryan is shooting for a movie, she creates a scene on the set, which upsets Aryan. The couple reconciles but Mahi is repeatedly insulted by Aryan's wife. While driving back from a party with Aryan, she raises the topic of his wife, which results in her being thrown out of the car.

Realising her place in Aryan's life, Mahi goes into depression, putting her career in decline. A friend convinces Mahi to leave the past behind her and re-enter the industry so Mahi decides to rejuvenate her career. She employs a public relations manager, Pallavi, who uses sensationalist tactics to reinvent Mahi's image. Mahi starts a relationship with the Vice Captain of the Indian National Cricket team, Angad Paul. Soon, her personal and professional life is stable once again. On the advice of Pallavi, she uses Angad's connections to get a role in a big budget film. The lead actor of the film, Abbas Khan, a married playboy, attempts to initiate an affair with her. She rejects him, which causes him to seek revenge. He demands that the director re-edit the movie so that story becomes about him and an item girl. Mahi is dissatisfied despite the film being a success, and in a desperate attempt to prove her acting skills, works in a low-budget art film for months. Angad proposes to her but she feels that they should concentrate on their careers. This causes their relationship to end. The art film never completes, and Mahi goes into depression again. She is also denied the opportunity to adopt a child, due to her history of alcoholism and psychiatric problems. Since she cannot get a role in big-budget productions, she decides to work on a low-budget film with newcomers.

Mahi meets Aryan at a wedding, and he apologises. The two rekindle their relationship. Aryan says that he wants her to do a big budget film with him but the director is reluctant to cast her as she has lost her appeal. Mahi becomes obsessed with the thought of losing the role to another heroine. At a poorly-attended press conference for an upcoming film, Mahi is mocked by journalists who inform her that the director has cast another actress opposite Aryan. Distraught, Mahi and Pallavi decide to create controversy by leaking the sex tape of her and Aryan. The video becomes a viral sensation and as a result, the low-budget film becomes an instant hit.

Mahi's success is short-lived. She starts questioning her career and life choices. She finally decides to leave the industry after her agent Rashid Bhai, a father figure to her, quits, and Shagufta Rizvi, a veteran actress she respected and admired, dies. At the end, Mahi is shown walking alone in a foreign country, and on being asked if she is Mahi Arora, she replies she is not.

Cast
 Kareena Kapoor as Mahi Arora: She is the main protagonist of the film. A falling superstar who has a bipolar disorder, she struggle between her life and career choices ultimately leading to tragic consequences.
 Arjun Rampal as Aryan Khanna: An Indian superstar, who is in love with Mahi, but does not accept his relationship with her publicly, his ex-wife keeps taunting him about his relationship which leads to his breakup with the former. However, later he patches up with Mahi only to break up with her permanently due to a misunderstanding.
Randeep Hooda as Angad Paul: Hooda was cast by the director to essay the role of a cricketer. Prior to the start of principal photography, actor Arunoday Singh was chosen to play the role, but was later dropped from the film due to unknown reasons. Media reports began speculating the name of several actors (such as Ranbir Kapoor, Imran Khan and Prateik Babbar) though Bhandarkar later confirmed that he had selected Hooda after seeing his performance in Saheb, Biwi Aur Gangster (2011). As a way to make his character more believable, Hooda began taking tips and lessons from cricketer Virender Sehwag.
 Sanjay Suri as Abbas Khan: An Indian superstar, who is really egoistic. He likes to flirt repeatedly with his co-stars despite being warned by his wife. When Mahi refuses to give in to his offer, he gets her role cut in his film and hires another Bollywood heroine Gayatri to do an item number and stealing the spotlight from the former.
 Govind Namdeo as Mahi Arora's devoted secretary Rashid Bhai.
 Raqesh Bapat as Sameer Khan: Raqesh was cast in November 2011 to play "one of [Kapoor's] lovers". The director announced that Raqesh Vashisth's character would be kept under wraps along with a few other characters such as that of Goswami's and Dutta's.
 Shahana Goswami as Promita Roy: Goswami was selected to play an important character in the film.
 Divya Dutta as Pallavi Narayan: Along with Goswami, Dutta was also selected to play an important character in the film. Pallavi is a tough-talking publicist who is expert in image building. She helps Mahi resurrect her career when she fades into oblivion. She almost succeeds in bringing Mahi to the top but due to the latter's insecurities and failed relationships, her career faces a setback. Later on, Pallavi helps Mahi once again in bringing her back to the spotlight but that results in tragic consequences. 
 Pallavi Sharda as Gayatri
 Mugdha Godse as Rhea Mehra: Godse was roped in to play the character of Rhea Mehra, a rival heroine who is jealous of Mahi Arora's success.
 Helen as Shagufta Rizvi: Helen was cast by the director to essay the role of a senior actress.
 Shilpi Sharma as Isha: Sharma, who described Bhandarkar as "a family friend" was approached by the director to play a glamorous role. In preparation for the role, Sharma was required to lose weight and sign a non-disclosure agreement.
 Lillete Dubey as Mrs. Arora: Dubey was cast by the director to essay the role of Kapoor's mother.
 Ranvir Shorey as Tapan Da: Described as the director's "lucky mascot", Shorey was roped in to make a cameo appearance.
 Ankita Ghazan as friend of both Mahi Arora and Aryan Khanna. Also the industrialist's daughter who unites Mahi and Aryan through her wedding
 Bikramjeet Kanwarpal
 Sanjay Gagnani
 Dilnaz Irani as Tamanna
 Pooja Chopra as Shaheen (cameo appearance)
 Rashmi Nigam as Zaara

Production

Development
Following the completion of his film, Jail (2009), Bhandarkar began toying with the idea of making a project on the Hindi film industry. Along with writer Niranjan Iyengar, the director began developing the story about the life of an actress and later approached UTV Motion Pictures with whom he had worked on several occasions. Bhandarkar, who was keen on using the title Heroine for his film, donated  to Guddu Dhanoa's charity. He later explained that he had been subconsciously preparing for the movie ever since he joined the industry.

Pre-production work on the film was expected to commence during the summer of 2010 but was put on hold due to Kapoor being busy with other commitments. During this period, Bhandarkar announced that he would be making another project while putting Heroine on hold. Though speculated to be based on the lives of yesteryear divas like Madhubala and Marilyn Monroe, Bhandarkar denied the reports saying that the movie is a "contemporary film which reveals the underbelly of the movie industry and its well-kept secrets". In an attempt to prepare his protagonist for the film, the director prepared a three-hour documentary on Hollywood actresses Marilyn Monroe, Elizabeth Taylor, Ava Gardner and Vivien Leigh. Designer Manish Malhotra was signed on to design the costumes. Choreography of the movie was done by Remo D'Souza, Ganesh Acharya and Jasmin Oza.

Filming
Production for the film was marred by the kidnapping and brutal murder of Meenakshi Thapar by a co-star, Amit Jaiswal, who like Thapar, only had a minor role in the film. Thapar was strangled in her hotel room in Gorakhpur and her body dumped into a water tank and severed head thrown out of the window of a moving bus.

Marketing

Release Of First Look (With Aishwarya Rai) 
The first look of the movie was released as part of the 64th Cannes Film Festival. A promotional poster was released during a press conference in which Ronnie Screwvala of UTV Motion Pictures, Madhur Bhandarkar, and Aishwarya Rai officially announced the movie. The director said, "The movie is a glamorous yet bold story of the internal journey of a superstar. I am certain it will appeal to audiences across the globe and Aishwarya was a perfect choice for the role. In fact, no one could've played it better." Screwvala stated "With Heroine, we plan to take things to the next level. When you watch the film, you will feel that the role was written with someone as talented and stunning as Aishwarya in mind." The actress too admitted that she was "looking forward to this new journey in the movie." It was also announced that Rai will have a wardrobe of more than 40 outfits designed by Manish Malhotra in the film. Explaining why he was launching the project in Cannes, Screwvala alluded to Rai's star power saying, "She is the brand ambassador for India and for Indian cinema when it comes to the French Riviera." The actress was quick to deny any reference to her personal life being portrayed in the movie and said that the entire idea was a result of Bhandarkar's conceptualisation. The official press release distributed as a part of the announcement stated that "The film is based on the life and times of a superstar heroine, Mahi from the dream factory we call 'Bollywood'. The film is a daring, shocking, glamorous, scandalous behind-the-scenes account of the reality behind the world of glitz and glamour that our film stars inhabit. For a country obsessed with films and film stars, Heroine will take audiences on a voyeuristic journey to see what really goes on in the lives of India's sweethearts."

Release Of First Look (With Kareena Kapoor) 
The director initially planned to put-forth the theatrical trailer attached to the release of Rowdy Rathore on 1 June 2012. However, there were several matured content featuring Kareena Kapoor, which were essential and must be there to retain the motive of the film title, as per the director. The Central Board of Film Certification awarded an 'A' certificate to the trailer but chopped off Kapoor's smoking scenes and lovemaking scenes from the trailer. The trailer was then scheduled for a 6 July 2012 release, as it would be releasing alongside Bol Bachchan, although it was then postponed to 20 July 2012. It was once again delayed so it did not clash with the late Rajesh Khanna's chautha. On 22 July 2012, 2 of the first look posters were revealed on the micro blogging site, Twitter, and received an amazing response in just 8 hours. The trailer was released on 25 July 2012 online and with Kyaa Super Kool Hain Hum on 27 July 2012 in theatres. The trailer crossed over 1 million hits on YouTube within 2 days.

The trailer was released on 25 July 2012. After the release of the trailer, a controversy arose. In the film's promo, a dialogue of Kareena Kapoor: "If a heroine buys a car, it's gifted to her by a businessman. If she goes to LA (Los Angeles), she's getting plastic surgery done and, god forbid, if she goes to Dubai, you people make a rate-card for her," was not appreciated by the people of Dubai. To avoid hurting sentiments, director Madhur Bhandarkar has had the offending statement censored in the Dubai version. He clarified, "We have censored it. There are some people who have raised objections. But we did not mean to demean anyone, Dubai is my personal favourite city."

Music

It was announced that music director duo Salim–Sulaiman, who had earlier worked with Madhur Bhandarkar in Fashion (2008), will be composing the songs for Heroine.

During the shooting of the film, Bhandarkar revealed that there would be 2 big item numbers in the film, both to be picturized on the leading lady. One of them, "Halkat Jawani", sung by Sunidhi Chauhan was released as a single track release on 17 August 2012. Musicperk.com rated the album 7/10 quoting "Although songs like 'Halkat Jawani', 'Khwahishein' and 'Tujhpe Fida' sound nice and enthusiastic as independent tracks, others probably would need to rely on the picturization of the song for the required effect to be created".

Reception

Box office
The film grossed  on its opening day. Heroine had an average weekend of  nett. The film had collected a fair  in its first week. The film had a heavy fall in second week and managed only  nett. It collected Rs. 144 million.

Critical response
Heroine received mixed reviews, with most critics praising the story, music and the cast performances, while the screenplay garnered predominantly negative reviews.

On the review aggregator website Rotten Tomatoes reported an approval rating of 30% with an average score of 5.0/10, based on 6 reviews. The website's critical consensus reads, "A brief snapshot of a much bigger picture, this is an interesting film as far as it goes but, like its subject, not all that unusual."

Taran Adarsh of Bollywood Hungama gave the film a rating of 3.5 out of 5 while saying "Watch HEROINE for Madhur's imposing direction, for Kapoor' superlative performance, watch it also for its fearless, inspiring and enlightening storyline divulging the scandalous realities of the movie industry. Try not to miss it!". Shomini Sen of Zee News gave it a score of 3 out of 5 and said "Does Heroine work? Yes, but only because of Kareena Kapoor. From doing the raunchy act in 'Halkat Jawani' to the scenes where she is battling depression and popping pills, Kapoor makes Mahi memorable and lovable. Heroine is absolutely Kapoor's film, not Bhandarkar's. 2 for the film and 1 extra for Bebo! 3 cheers for the film!". Aniruddha Guha of DNA gave Heroine 2 out 5 stars while commenting, "The characters are all caricatured and the screenplay meanders along aimlessly, it being nothing more than an assemblage of scenes – each disjointed from the other – strung together in a long, sleep-inducing and pointless narrative". Saibal Chatterjee of NDTV rated it 2 out of 5 stars, noting "The film that Bhandarkar has made is indeed disappointingly mechanical. Mercifully, Kapoor does demonstrate that she has a feel for the character. But, then, why wouldn't she? After all she plays herself in Heroine".

Rajeev Masand of CNN-IBN rated the film 2 out of 5 and said "Despite an entertaining first-half, thanks to all the unintentional laughs, Heroine slips into a slush of melodrama post-interval. By this point, it feels interminably long and boring". Sukanya Verma of Rediff.com gave it 2 out of 5 stars, remarking "There's nothing innovative about Bhandarkar's Heroine. I am not sure if this is Bhandarkar's idea of comic relief but the hall roared with laughter. What's not funny is just how stunning Kapoor looks or gives to her role as Mahi Arora". Roshni Devi of Koimoi gave the film 1.5 out 5 stars, reviewing "Heroine irritates more than entertains, but some of the performances are nice. Kapoor does a good job and, heck, you even get to see her in a pseudo-lesbian scene along with other steamy scenes. If that's enough to drag you to see Heroine, go ahead. Give it a miss otherwise".

Nominations 

 58th Filmfare Awards

 Best Actress – Kareena Kapoor

 14th IIFA Awards

 Best Actress – Kareena Kapoor
 Best Supporting Actress – Divya Dutta

 8th Apsara Film & Television Producers Guild Awards

 Best Actress – Kareena Kapoor

19th Screen Awards

 Best Actress – Kareena Kapoor

2013 Stardust Awards

 Actor of the Year – Female – Kareena Kapoor
 Best Actress in a Drama – Kareena Kapoor

References

External links
 
 

2012 films
2010s Hindi-language films
Films about women in India
Films directed by Madhur Bhandarkar
UTV Motion Pictures films
Films about Bollywood